Helen Troke (born 7 November 1964) MBE, is a retired female badminton player of England.

Career
She won the bronze medal at the 1983 IBF World Championships in women's singles. From 1982 to 1986 she won two singles and three team titles at the European championships.

She represented England and won double gold in the team event, at the 1982 Commonwealth Games in Brisbane, Queensland, Australia.

Achievements

World Championships

Commonwealth Games

European Championships

European Junior Championships

IBF World Grand Prix 
The World Badminton Grand Prix sanctioned by International Badminton Federation (IBF) from 1983 to 2006.

Open tournaments

IBF International

References

English statistics
European results
Pat Davis: The Encyclopaedia of Badminton. Robert Hale, London, 1987, p. 170,

External links
 
 
 

English female badminton players
Commonwealth Games gold medallists for England
Badminton players at the 1982 Commonwealth Games
Members of the Order of the British Empire
1964 births
Living people
Commonwealth Games medallists in badminton
Medallists at the 1982 Commonwealth Games
Medallists at the 1986 Commonwealth Games
Medallists at the 1990 Commonwealth Games